Hkamti Long (also known as Khamti Long), also known as Khandigyi was a Shan state in what is today Burma. It was an outlying territory, located by the Mali River, north of Myitkyina District, away from the main Shan State area in present-day Kachin State. The main town was Putao.

History
Hkamti Long began as an outlying territory of the Shan state of Mongkawng and was settled by the Hkamti, a sub-group of the Shan people. The name means "Great Place of Gold" in the Hkamti Khamti language. It gathered seven small principalities:  Lokhun, Mansi, Lon Kyein, Manse-Hkun, Mannu, Langdao, Mong Yak and Langnu which were under the 
Hkamti Long was beyond the borders of the British Mandalay Division and was never brought under direct British rule, after the Shan states submitted to British rule after the fall of the Konbaung dynasty.

Hkamti Long was visited by traveller Thomas Thornville Cooper, British Agent at Bhamo, where he was murdered in 1878; later also by colonels Macgregor and Woodthorpe in 1884-1885, by Errol Gray in 1892-1893, and by Prince Henry of Orleans in 1893.

Towards the end of the 19th century the inhabitants were still mostly Shan, but they ended up being absorbed or expelled by the Kachin people and other dominant ethnic groups of the region.

Rulers
The rulers of Hkamti Long bore the title of Saopha.

Saophas
c.1860 - c.1862            ...
c.1862 - 1910 San Nwe Cho                        (b. 1837 - d. 1910)
1910 - 1915 San Nwe No                         (b. 1855 - d. 1915)
13 Aug 1915 - 19.. Sao Hpa Hkan                       (b. c.1854 - d. 19..)

References

External links
The Imperial Gazetteer of India
"Gazetteer of Upper Burma and the Shan states"

Shan States

ca:Hkamti Long